James Bewick (21 December 1906 – 1979) was an English footballer who played in defence for Newcastle United, Port Vale, Walsall, Yeovil & Petters United, and South Shields.

Career
Bewick played for Herrington Swifts and Newcastle United, before joining Port Vale in May 1935. He made his debut at centre-half in a 1–1 draw with Bradford City at Valley Parade on 14 September 1935, but only made two further Second Division appearances in the 1935–36 season before being released from The Old Recreation Ground in May 1936. He then moved on to Walsall, Yeovil & Petters United and South Shields.

Career statistics
Source:

References

Footballers from Sunderland
English footballers
Association football defenders
Newcastle United F.C. players
Port Vale F.C. players
Walsall F.C. players
Yeovil Town F.C. players
South Shields F.C. (1936) players
English Football League players
1906 births
1979 deaths